Ashington is a town and civil parish in Northumberland, England, with a population of 27,864 at the 2011 Census. It was once a centre of the coal mining industry.

Many inhabitants have a distinctive accent and dialect known as Pitmatic. This varies from the regional dialect known as Geordie.

History

Toponymy 
The name Ashington comes from the earlier form Essendene, which has been referenced since 1170. This may have originated from a given name Æsc, not unknown among Saxon invaders who sailed from Northern Germany. If so he came to the Wansbeck and would have settled in this deep wooded valley near Sheepwash. The "de" in the early orthographies more strongly suggests dene, so ash dene - these trees would have lined it. In the 1700s all that existed of Ashington was a small farm with a few dwellings around it.

Coal mining 
The first evidence of mining is from bell-shaped pits and monastic mine workings discovered in the 20th Century during tunnelling. Ashington developed from a small hamlet in the 1840s when the Duke of Portland built housing to encourage people escaping the Great Famine of Ireland to come and work at his nearby collieries. As in many other parts of Britain, "deep pit" coal mining in the area declined during the 1980s and 1990s leaving just one colliery, Ellington, which closed in January 2005. In 2006 plans for an opencast mine on the outskirts of the town were put forward, although many people objected to it. During the heyday of coal-mining, Ashington was considered to be the "world's largest coal-mining village". There is now a debate about whether Ashington should be referred to as a town or a village; if considered as a village it would be one of the largest villages in England.

Growth of the town 

As coal mining expanded, more people left the countryside and settled in Ashington. This led the Ashington Coal Company to build parallel rows of colliery houses. Some newcomers came from as far as Cornwall to make use of their tin-mining skills.

Ashington railway station opened in 1878, and services to Newbiggin and Tynemouth were operated by the Blyth and Tyne Railway. The nearest station to Ashington on the East Coast Main Line was Longhirst to the north west of the town, which opened in 1847 and had services to both Newcastle and Edinburgh. By 1896, the town had grown sufficiently to warrant the creation of Ashington Urban District.

In 1913 the original Ashington Hospital was built. It was about 1/4 mile from the town centre. The hospital was expanded in the 1950s and 60s with large new wings.

Traditionally the area to the east of the railway was called Hirst and that to the west was Ashington proper. Although collectively called Ashington, both halves had their own park: Hirst Park (opened in 1915) in the east and the People's Park in the west.

The colliery-built houses followed a grid plan. The streets in the Hirst End running north to south were named after British trees, such as Hawthorn Road, Beech Terrace, and Chestnut Street. The east-west running streets were numbered avenues, starting with First Avenue near the town centre, finishing at Seventh Avenue towards the southern end. After the 1920s houses in Ashington were built by the council and were most often semi-detached houses, such as Garden City Villas. These occupied much of the fields in the Hirst area. New estates were built in different areas. The biggest building programme was in the late 1960s and saw Ashington extend south from Seventh Avenue opposite the Technical College towards North Seaton and south eastwards towards the A189. Some of the houses at the north end of Alexandra Road were private homes. During this building programme several new schools were built, for example Coulson Park, Seaton Hirst Middle. Community shops and a social club (the Northern) were built off Fairfield Drive. The late 1970s and early 1980s saw construction of Nursery Park opposite the North Seaton Hotel. The late 1980s and 1990s saw the building of the Wansbeck Estate between the River Wansbeck and Green Lane as well as the large Fallowfield Estate.

Decline of the Coal Industry 
In 1964, as part of the Beeching Axe, Ashington railway station was closed. The site of the station was developed in the late 1960s into Wansbeck Square, housing a supermarket, council offices and a public library, built partly over the railway line.

In 1981 the Woodhorn Pit closed and its chimney was demolished. In the late 1980s this became a museum. In 1988 Ashington Pit was closed and is now occupied by a business park. In the early 2000s maisonette flats in various parts of Hirst were demolished and parts of the Moorhouse and Woodbridge estate opposite Woodhorn Pit were demolished.

The railway was used until recently by the Alcan Aluminium plant, to transport coal to its adjacent power station in the nearby town of Lynemouth. The plant closed in late 2015. The line was put in use again from mid-2017 to transport materials to Lynemouth, for the conversion of the coal-fired power station to produce power from biomass.

In October 2008, plans to opencast 2m tonnes of coal in Ashington were approved. UK Coal's plans which were first submitted in 2005, would create 60+ jobs.

Geography

Ashington is in south east Northumberland, which is a largely urban area adjacent to Newcastle. Most of the area is of flat ground formed during the Carboniferous period when ancient tropical swamp forests were buried and formed the coal seams that have given this area its significance. The local geology is of yellow sandstone. The land to the north west of the town is slightly undulating due to mining subsidence, which sometimes causes farmland to be flooded. The south east part of the town is slightly raised giving views to the north.

The town is roughly square in shape, lying north to south. The town centre is in the north of the town. South of this are residential areas. Farmland is on both east and west flanks. The south part is residential bordered by the River Wansbeck to the south. To the east of the town is the small coastal town of Newbiggin and to the west is the small village of Bothal, also on the River Wansbeck. South of the town is the small village of North Seaton which once had its own pit. North of the town about 2 miles is the village of Linton and north east of the town is Lynemouth.

To the north of the town is Queen Elizabeth II Country Park which contains a lake surrounded by pine woodland plantation. The original Ashington Colliery was on the north west of the town and the smaller Woodhorn Pit was on the north east.

Climate and soil

The climate is cool temperate. Summers are drier than on the west coast of Britain, but cooler than southerly areas. Winters are cold at times, sometimes with snow. The soil is of a dark brown colour, free draining and gritty. It is very good for growing vegetables. Tender perennials are rare; some palms will grow, but need winter protection. Although Phormiums (New Zealand flax) grow in displays in Newbiggin, salt-laden winds may afford them some protection. The most exposed part of the town is to the east. High trees in Hirst Park give considerable shelter. The west part is much more sheltered, especially the wooded valley of the River Wansbeck.  Climate in this area has mild differences between highs and lows, and there is adequate rainfall year-round.  The Köppen Climate Classification subtype for this climate is "Cfb" (Marine West Coast Climate/Oceanic climate).

Environs and villages surrounding Ashington

Working in a clockwise direction from the north west of Ashington are the following places.
 Linton, a small village, originally developed for mineworkers at the Linton Colliery. This village looks unusual from the air: it is almost square and its streets are in a parallel grid-plan.
 Ellington, a newer village which was located next to Ellington Colliery.
 Lynemouth, close to the coast; this village is next to the Alcan Lynemouth Aluminium Smelter, now closed and a wind farm site and Lynemouth Power Station.
 Woodhorn, a tiny hamlet with a church on the road to Newbiggin. Some of the area of Ashington adjacent to Woodhorn pit museum is also called Woodhorn.
 Newbiggin-by-the-Sea, a small town or village, this is a former seaside resort, visited by locals. It has a beach and, following coastal erosion, a large sea wall was built in the late 1980s. Newbiggin offers bed and breakfasts, cafes and some shops.
 Cambois (pronounced Cammus) is a small village south of the River Wansbeck. It is quite spread out. Cambois has some fishing cottages at the mouth of the river. It has a beach and views along the coast towards north Blyth and Blyth.
 North Seaton, a village on the north banks of the River Wansbeck. It was formerly a mining village, but most of its population moved to Ashington. North Seaton had its own small colliery.
 Stakeford, originally a small village south of the River Wansbeck, this is mainly an area of residential estates.
 Guide Post, a residential village on the road towards Morpeth, it has a school and some shops.
 Sheepwash, a crossing point on the River Wansbeck before it flows west towards Bothal.
 Bothal, a quaint, historic village on the wooded banks of the River Wansbeck. Bothal has cottages and a 14th Century castle, Bothal Castle. Riverside walks can be taken along the wooded riverbank.
 Pegswood, village on the main East Coast Main Line. The village has a train station served by local trains.
 Longhirst, a small hamlet on the East Coast Main Line.

Transport

Construction is currently underway on the construction of the Northumberland Line, which will reinstate passenger railway services from Ashington to Bedlington, Blyth, Seaton Delaval, Shiremoor and Newcastle. Passenger services are currently scheduled to begin operation in December 2023.

In the meantime, the nearest mainline railway station is Pegswood on the East Coast Main Line, about 3 miles from Ashington town centre. However, Pegswood is served by only three trains per day. Morpeth station is the nearest station with a regular service, with trains to Cramlington, Newcastle and Edinburgh.

At the east end of the main shopping street is the bus station, with local Arriva North East and Go North East buses linking to the rest of Northumberland and to Newcastle.

Ashington is well served by roads. The A189 (Spine Road) to the east of Ashington runs south via Blyth and North Tyneside to Newcastle, and via the A19 Tyne Tunnel to South Tyneside and the A1(M). The A1068 runs north along the coast to Alnwick. The A196 and A197 runs west towards Morpeth and the A1 which goes north to Scotland and Edinburgh or south to the A1(M) near Newcastle on towards Durham and Yorkshire and the South.

The nearest airport is Newcastle Airport, which provides scheduled domestic flights, flights covering many major cities in Europe, long haul international flights and holiday charter flights. There is a port in nearby North Shields with passenger services to IJmuiden in the Netherlands.

Town's facilities

Museums and libraries
A reasonable-sized public library is based in the Leisure Centre on Lintonville Terrace at the northern fringes of the town. The local museum is at Woodhorn pit. It is mainly a museum of the town's mining history with pictures and models. There are also various arts exhibits in the museum, including a permanent exhibition of the Pitmen Painters' paintings, and information on local history.

Sports
Ashington has several sports facilities and numerous sports clubs.  A new leisure centre was erected on the former Asda site in the town centre, it opened in December 2015.

Hirst Park provides two good quality bowling greens as well as tennis and basketball courts. Ashington A.F.C. now play at Woodhorn Lane having moved from Portland Park to make way for the new Asda superstore in 2008. Rugby is played at a ground on the north west edge of the town and cricket is played off Kenilworth Road not far from the town centre.

In recent years a new community facility has been created from the former Miners Welfare centre on Alexandra Road. The Hirst Welfare Centre is a multi-use community facility with training facilities, office space, a cafe, community hall, gym and dance studio. The Centre also has an external all-weather, floodlight synthetic football pitch with additional grass pitches.

Accommodation
There are some bed and breakfasts in Ashington. To the north side of Queen Elizabeth lake is a motel with pub and restaurant and located on the site of the QE2 is a Premier Inn hotel/restaurant. There is also a holiday centre/caravan site near Sandy Bay off the A189 about 3 miles to the south east of the town centre.

Parks walks and green spaces
Riverside Park provides a peaceful riverside setting in which to relax or take walks. The park runs along the Wansbeck River. There are public footpaths and bridleways from here towards the quaint village of Bothal with its photogenic castle above the river.

The People's Park near the leisure centre off Institute Road is a large green field suitable for recreation. Hirst Park is located off Hawthorn Road; locally, it has traditionally been known as The Flower Park, due to its summer floral displays. It has bowling greens, basketball and tennis courts, play areas and is sheltered by tall trees. To the north of the park is a large sports field, where historically, the town hosted fun fairs.

At Woodhorn is the Queen Elizabeth II Park. This is surrounded by pine wood, including the Ashington Community Woods, connecting the park to Ashington, and has a large lake with a narrow-gauge railway connecting the main car park to the Woodhorn Museum. Walks from here head out towards Linton and eastwards towards the seaside town of Newbiggin following the old railway line.

Ashington enjoys a good location within Northumberland allowing good access to the countryside. The town is situated near the coast, enabling short journey times to beaches such as Druridge Bay and Cresswell. Northumberland National Park is close by.

Education

The previous system of first school, middle school and high school used in Ashington was phased out in September 2015, with Bothal Middle School and Hirst Park Middle School closing. First schools became primary schools while Ashington High School (now Ashington Academy) became a full secondary school. Schools were first built by the Ashington coal company, but many have since been replaced.

Northumberland College (formerly, Ashington Technical College) is the main further education provider in the town, and offers A levels, NVQs, vocational courses and various evening classes.

Healthcare

There are many General Practitioner (GP) surgeries in Ashington. The main Wansbeck General Hospital in Ashington is located at the north east of the town near Woodhorn. Major treatments are provided at hospitals in Newcastle. A&E services are provided at the Northumbria Specialist Emergency Care Hospital in nearby Cramlington.

Local media
The local newspapers are: the Evening Chronicle, The Journal. These papers cover Tyneside and south east Northumberland. The News Post Leader covers mostly Wansbeck.

There are several radio regional stations providing local broadcasts.

Local news on television is provided by ITV Tyne Tees and BBC Look North. These TV stations cover most of the north east, County Durham, Teesside, Tyneside and Northumberland.

Politics
 the local member of parliament is Ian Lavery of the Labour Party, with Ashington forming part of the Wansbeck constituency. This is traditionally a Labour safe seat, but in recent years the constituency has become more marginal thanks to the town's strong Leave vote at the 2016 European Union membership referendum, and Labour won by just 814 votes in the 2019 general election.

Ashington elects six County Councillors (One with part of West Newbiggin) to Northumberland County Council as of 2014, these seats are held by Labour Party candidates. Ashington Town Council is made up of six wards each electing three councillors, as of 2014 seventeen of these are held by the Labour Party.

Industry and employment

Until 1988 the majority of the town's male population was employed in the mining industry. The closure of the pits led to large scale unemployment. However limited coal mining was carried out until recently at Ellington Colliery and opencast coal extraction is carried out at Butterwell Opencast.

The former site of Ashington Colliery became part of a regeneration project and saw the development of Wansbeck Business Park. This park now houses a number of companies with local, national and international profiles. These include Polar Krush NICC Ltd, Thermacore Ltd and Sugarfayre Ltd. The park includes a variety of wildlife with a large pond at its centre.

Ashington's close proximity to Newcastle upon Tyne makes it an ideal commuter town for people working in the city.

Arts and culture

In 1934 some of the Ashington miners enrolled in painting classes as an alternative pastime and then began to produce paintings to sell at local markets to supplement their poor wages. They achieved unexpected success and approval from the art community and were given prestigious gallery exhibitions during the 1930s and 1940s under the name "The Pitmen Painters", although the group had called themselves the "Ashington Group". In the 1970s the group's work was "rediscovered" and popularised as "workers' art" and given international exhibitions. On 26 October 2006 a new £16m museum housing the work was opened in Ashington by The Princess Royal.

The book The Pitmen Painters by William Feaver, recording the development of the Ashington Group, 1934 to 1984, has been made into a stage play by Lee Hall, well known for Billy Elliot. The play premiered at the Live Theatre, Newcastle upon Tyne, in 2007 and subsequently was produced at the Royal National Theatre, London in 2008 and 2009. A German translation by Michael Raab premiered at the Volkstheater in Vienna, Austria, in April 2009. In 2011 Oscar/BAFTA award-winning Film Director Jon Blair made a film for ITV1's Perspectives Arts series, entitled Robson Green and The Pitmen Painters giving an insight into the lives and work of the Ashington Group including rare film footage of the group in their Hut including interviews with Oliver Kilbourn and Harry Wilson.

Ashington has appeared in various films and TV programmes, such as Spender starring Jimmy Nail, Our Friends in the North in 1996, The Fast Show on BBC2 and the Alcan chimneys were seen in the movie, Billy Elliot.

The mining workers of Ashington gave a 'Hooky mat' to their friends in Ashington, West Sussex, where it is now displayed in the village hall.

Notable residents

Ian Lavery, President of the National Union of Mineworkers
William Timlin, author and architect

Sporting personalities
Ashington has produced a number of professional footballers, notably Jack Milburn, Jackie Milburn, Mark Cullen, Jimmy Adamson, Jack Charlton, Bobby Charlton, Cecil Irwin, Colin Ayre, David Thompson, Chris Adamson, Martin Taylor, Peter Ramage, Brian Carolin and Ethan Ross. Premier League referee Michael Oliver, the youngest in the league's history, was born in the town. Property developer Sir John Hall, former Chairman and Life President of Newcastle United Football Club, was born in North Seaton village on the outskirts of the town in 1933. Mike Norris (football manager), current head coach of Portland Thorns FC, was born in Ashington.

Cricketing brothers Steve Harmison and Ben Harmison are from the town, as are fellow cricketers Mark Wood and Simon Smith. The first-class cricketer Jack Clark was born in Ashington.

Golfer Kenneth Ferrie, who has played on the PGA Tour, is from Ashington.

See also
List of towns in England

References

Further reading

External links

Ashington Community website
Northumberland Communities (Accessed: 5 November 2008)

 
Towns in Northumberland
Civil parishes in Northumberland